United Nations Ebola Response Fund is a special fund set up by the United Nations Foundation to allow donations to support U.N. institutions to respond to the Ebola virus epidemic in West Africa. The U.N. has received other money for Ebola, but the fund is more flexible in how it can be spent. The U.N. announced the fund on 12 September 2014.

They asked for one billion dollars to be donated, and by 21 October 2014 50 million had already been pledged. On November 11 the Philippines government announced it would donate 1 million to the fund.

Countries that have pledged or committed money to the fund by 7 November 2014 include Australia, Azerbaijan, Canada, Chile, China, Colombia, Denmark, Estonia, Finland, Germany, India, the Republic of Ireland, Japan, Kazakhstan, Luxembourg, Malta, New Zealand, Norway, Romania, South Korea, Sweden, the United Kingdom, and Venezuela.

See also
 World Health Organization

References

External links
 Ebola Response Fund: Trust Fund fact sheet

West African Ebola virus epidemic
International medical and health organizations
Organizations established by the United Nations
Organizations established in 2014